Harriton is an informal designation given to the northwestern portion of Lower Merion Township, Pennsylvania. Located in the suburbs of Philadelphia, it is one of the wealthiest areas in the state. Harriton contains the community of Gladwyne, and also the northeastern portions of Villanova, Rosemont, and Bryn Mawr. It is located just to the north of the SEPTA R5 line and forms a portion of the Main Line suburbs.

Community Overview
Harriton is located towards the western end of the Main Line suburbs, and is bordered by the Blue Route and Schuylkill River. It consists of several ridges in the eastern portions of Gladwyne and Villanova. The southern portions, south of Conshohocken State Road, are relatively flat. The area is primarily residential, with most commercial activity taking place near Lancaster Avenue immediately to the south.

Transportation
The community is served by the Blue Route and Schuylkill Expressway. Additionally, the SEPTA R5 Line provides commuter rail service to Center City Philadelphia.

Education
Harriton is served by the Lower Merion School District. Elementary schools in Harriton are Gladwyne Elementary, Belmont Hills Elementary, and Penn Valley Elementary. Secondary students in Harriton are served by Welsh Valley Middle School and Harriton High School. All of these schools are ranked among the best in Pennsylvania.

Several students in Harriton also attend private schools such as Agnes Irwin, Haverford, Baldwin, Shipley, Notre Dame, and Merion Mercy. Nearly all of these schools are located near or to the south of Lancaster Avenue.

Villanova University, Rosemont College, Bryn Mawr College, and Haverford College are all located to the immediate south of Harriton.

References

Philadelphia Main Line
Lower Merion Township, Pennsylvania
Census-designated places in Montgomery County, Pennsylvania
Welsh-American culture in Pennsylvania
Census-designated places in Pennsylvania